Peng Chia-mao (born 26 September 1996) is a Taiwanese archer competing in women's recurve events. She won the gold medal in the women's team event at the 2019 World Archery Championships held in 's-Hertogenbosch, Netherlands.

In 2018, she won the silver medal in the women's team recurve event at the Asian Games held in Jakarta, Indonesia. In 2019, she won the bronze medal in the women's individual recurve at the Summer Universiade held in Naples, Italy. She also won the gold medal in the mixed team event.

References

External links 
 

Living people
1996 births
Place of birth missing (living people)
Taiwanese female archers
World Archery Championships medalists
Asian Games medalists in archery
Asian Games silver medalists for Chinese Taipei
Archers at the 2018 Asian Games
Medalists at the 2018 Asian Games
Universiade medalists in archery
Universiade gold medalists for Chinese Taipei
Universiade bronze medalists for Chinese Taipei
Medalists at the 2019 Summer Universiade
Medalists at the 2017 Summer Universiade
20th-century Taiwanese women
21st-century Taiwanese women